James Donaldson Ross (7 March 1895 – after 1923) was a Scottish professional footballer who played for Raith Rovers and Tottenham Hotspur.

Football career 
Ross joined Tottenham Hotspur from Raith Rovers in 1923. The right back made seven appearances for the White Hart Lane club.

References 

1895 births
Sportspeople from Midlothian
Scottish footballers
English Football League players
Raith Rovers F.C. players
Tottenham Hotspur F.C. players
Year of death missing
Association football defenders